LGA 13xx may refer to:

 LGA 1366 (Socket B)
 LGA 1356 (Socket B2)